Danial is a masculine name, and a variant of Daniel.

Places
 Danial, Ardabil, Ardabil Province, Iran
 Danial, Mazandaran, Mazandaran Province, Iran

People 
 Danial Fadzly Abdullah (born 1979), Malaysian footballer
 Ferris Danial (born 1992), Malaysian footballer
 Danny Dyer (born 1977), English actor and television presenter

See also 
 
 
 Daniel (disambiguation)
 Danielle or Danyelle
 Danyal (disambiguation)